Nathan Mitchell is a Canadian actor. He is best known for his role as Earving / Black Noir in the Amazon Prime Video series The Boys, based on the comic book series of the same name. Mitchell debuted in 2007 with a recurring role on the series Aliens in America. He appeared on Arrow, The Tomorrow People, Timeless, iZombie and Supernatural. Mitchell also appeared in the 2018 film Scorched Earth and the Netflix original series Ginny & Georgia.

Mitchell was born in Mississauga, Ontario. He is of Trinidadian and Jamaican descent.

Filmography

Film

Television

Online

References

External links
 
 

Living people
Black Canadian male actors
Canadian male television actors
Canadian male film actors
Canadian people of Jamaican descent
Canadian people of Trinidad and Tobago descent
Male actors from Ontario
People from Mississauga
1988 births